This is a list of the National Register of Historic Places listings in Millard County, Utah.

This is intended to be a complete list of the properties and districts on the National Register of Historic Places in Millard County, Utah, United States. Latitude and longitude coordinates are provided for many National Register properties and districts; these locations may be seen together in a map.

There are 32 properties and districts listed on the National Register in the county, including 1 National Historic Landmark. One other site in the county was once listed, but has since been removed.



Current listings

|}

Former listing

|}

See also
 List of National Historic Landmarks in Utah
 National Register of Historic Places listings in Utah

References

External links

 
Millard
Buildings and structures in Millard County, Utah
Millard County, Utah